St. Mary's Monastery may refer to:

St. Mary's Monastery, Kakome, Albania
St. Mary's Monastery, Goranxi, Albania
St. Mary's Monastery (Zvërnec)
St. Mary of the Angels Church and Monastery, Green Bay, Wisconsin

See also
St. Mary's Monastery Church (disambiguation)